Cavendish-Bentinck is a surname associated with the Dukes of Portland and their descendants. Bentinck is a Dutch surname brought to England by William Bentinck, an advisor to William III of England. Cavendish was added to the family name by Bentinck's great-grandson the 3rd Duke of Portland, who married in 1766 Lady Dorothy Cavendish, daughter of the 4th Duke of Devonshire. By a family arrangement, she was the heiress to estates which had previously belonged to the defunct Newcastle branch of the Cavendish family, including Welbeck Abbey, which became the principal seat of the Dukes of Portland. Following the death of the 9th Duke in 1990, the family name became extinct.

Members
People with this surname include:
Lady Anne Cavendish-Bentinck (1916–2008)
William Cavendish-Bentinck, 3rd Duke of Portland (1738–1809), British Whig and Tory statesman and Prime Minister
Lord William Bentinck (1774–1839), British statesman
Lord William Charles Augustus Cavendish-Bentinck (1780–1826), great-great-grandfather of Queen Elizabeth II 
Lord George Cavendish-Scott-Bentinck (1802–1848)
Charles William Frederick Cavendish-Bentinck (1817–1865), Church of England clergyman
Caroline Cavendish-Bentinck (1832–1918), great-grandmother of Queen Elizabeth II
Cecilia Cavendish-Bentinck (1862–1938), maternal grandmother of Queen Elizabeth II 
Elizabeth Livingston Cavendish-Bentinck (1855–1943)
Prudence Penelope Cavendish Bentinck, who was painted by George Frederic Watts
William Cavendish-Bentinck, 6th Duke of Portland (1857–1943), Knight of the Garter
Lord Henry Cavendish-Bentinck (1863–1931)
William Cavendish-Bentinck, 7th Duke of Portland (1893–1977), 2nd Chancellor of the University of Nottingham
George Cavendish-Bentinck (1821–1891), Conservative politician
Ferdinand Cavendish-Bentinck, 8th Duke of Portland (1888–1980), English nobleman, grandson of the above
Victor Cavendish-Bentinck, 9th Duke of Portland (1897–1990), British diplomat, brother of the above

References

Compound surnames